Francesc Fernández de Xátiva y Contreras was Bishop of Urgel and ex-officio Co-Prince of Andorra from 1763 to 1771.

References

18th-century Princes of Andorra
Bishops of Urgell
18th-century Roman Catholic bishops in Spain
Year of birth missing
Year of death missing